The Lordship of Cameros (or Los Cameros) was a frontier lordship in the Sierra de Cameros in the province of La Rioja during the Middle Ages and the early modern period. It was originally part of the southern border of Navarre, comprising much of the territory that had been the Kingdom of Viguera in the first quarter of the eleventh century. It passed to Castile after 1076.

In the twelfth century, the lords of Cameros patronised the monastery of San Prudencio de Monte Laturce, where they were also buried. In 1162, Pedro and Diego Jiménez founded the Cistercian daughter house of Santa María de Rute. In 1181, they relocated it to Monte Laturce to "refound" the old monastery there on Cistercian lines.

Lords of Cameros
Fortún Ochoiz (1007–54)
Jimeno Fortúnez (1054–57)
Lope Fortúnez (1045–57)
Sancho Fortúnez (1057–64)
Jimeno Fortúnez (1064–1102)
Íñigo Jiménez (1102–20) — sometimes regarded as the first lord of Cameros
Jimeno Íñiguez (1120–47)
Pedro Jiménez (1155–67, d. 1175)
Diego Jiménez (1170–82, d. 1188)
Rodrigo Díaz (1214–19, d. 1220)
Simón Ruiz (d. 1277)

With the death of Simón, the lordship of Cameros passed to the crown.

Notes

Bibliography

La Rioja (Spain)
History of La Rioja (Spain)